CJPR-FM is a Canadian radio station that broadcasts a country format at 94.9 FM under its on-air branding as Real Country 94.9 in Blairmore, Alberta. The station was owned & operated by Newcap Radio until they were bought out by Stingray Digital.

CJPR originally began broadcasting at 1490 AM in 1972, until it moved to 94.9 FM in 2002.

On May 16, 2008, CJPR applied to the CRTC to add a transmitter at Pincher Creek, Alberta. The station was given approval on July 28, 2008 to operate a rebroadcaster in Pincher Creek at 92.7 FM (CJPV-FM).

In November 2016, CJPR rebranded under the Real Country brand, as with other Newcap-owned country stations in Alberta.

Rebroadcasters

References

External links
94.9 Real Country
CJPR History - Canadian Communications Foundation
 
 
 

Jpr
Jpr
Jpr
Radio stations established in 1972
1972 establishments in Alberta